Leftovers are the uneaten edible remains of a hot or cold meal.

Leftovers or The Leftovers may also refer to:

Music

Groups
 The Leftovers (American band), a 2000s punk band from Portland, Maine
 The Leftovers (Australian band), a 1970s punk rock group from Brisbane

Albums
 Leftovers, a 1997 album by Knut
 The Leftovers (album), a 2003 compilation album by the BoDeans 
 The Leftovers EP, a 2003 recording by the American hip hop group Ugly Duckling
 Leftovers, a 2008 album by Johnny Flynn & The Sussex Wit
 Leftovers, a 2011 album by Crease
 Leftovers, a 2011 EP by PS I Love You

Other uses in arts, entertainment, and media
 Leftovers (film), a 2017 Indonesian film
 The Leftovers (novel), a 2011 novel by American author Tom Perrotta
 The Leftovers (TV series), an HBO television series based on Tom Perrotta's novel
 "The Lefovers", a 1986 episode of the Walt Disney anthology television series